Wine Dierickx (born 1978) is a Flemish actress. She is a member of the 2001 founded independent Dutch-Flemish theatre group Wunderbaum, that have performed shows in The Netherlands, Germany, Italy, United States, Iran, Scandinavia and Brazil. Dierickx also appeared in more than twenty films since 2002.

Selected filmography

References

External links 

1978 births
Living people
Flemish film actresses